"Nobody Wants to Be Alone" is a song written by Michael Masser and Kye Fleming, and recorded by American country music artist Crystal Gayle.  It was released in March 1985 as the first single and title track from the album Nobody Wants to Be Alone.  The song reached number 3 on the Billboard Hot Country Singles & Tracks chart.

Chart performance

References

1985 singles
1985 songs
Crystal Gayle songs
Songs written by Kye Fleming
Songs written by Michael Masser
Warner Records singles